The Kamein, also known as the Kaman, are a Southeast Asian ethnic group indigenous to Rakhine State, Myanmar, where they primarily reside in, and who predominantly follow Islam. The name Kaman comes from Persian, meaning "bow." The Kaman are formally recognized by the Burmese government and classified as one of the seven ethnic groups composing the Rakhine national race. The Kaman are considered indigenous and are widely acknowledged as Burmese citizens who hold national identity cards.

History

Origin of the Kaman Ethnic Group
Kaman is a term used since the days of the Rakhine kings to refer to the archers of the Rakhine Royal army. According to researchers and ethnographic studies, the word Kaman originated from the Persian word for "bow" and means "skilled in bow and arrow" or "archer". In the Ministry of Education's distance education syllabus (Ma-412) for final year compulsory Myanmar teaching of "Rakhine Princess Lyric" the word Kaman was defined in line 33 to soldiers who were experts in archery and served in the Royal army of Rakhine Kingdom.

As Kaman people were proficient in archery and had sufficient mental faculty and martial prowess, got the prestigious positions in Rakhine Royal army. The archer branch was named Kaman Archers' There were many historical documents about Kaman that expressed only Rakhine indigenous people were allowed to serve in Rakhine Royal army" which meant foreigners were not allowed to serve in Royal army.
By assessing the above mentioned facts, one can make conclusion that present day Kaman people are not aliens but pedigree of Kaman archer of ancient [Rakhine] Kingdom. Kaman people of present day are accepting the religion of Islam and are Muslims.

As ethnic Kaman people are descendants of ancient Rakhine people, their language, dressing, culture are identical to main Rakhine people, but totally different from other Muslims living in Rakhine region and mainland Myanmar. The cultural attitude is quite different from other Muslims too.

In olden days. Kaman was not the name of a specific ethnic group but common name of Rakhine Royal archer regiment's name. After the breakdown of Rakhine Kingdom, the archers remained in groups and their descendants were the present day Kaman people of Rakhine region. During the reign of king Ba Saw Pru, prominent royal court poet Adu Min Nyo wrote in his verse of Rakhine Princess lyric about Kaman in line 33-34 as the brave archers of Rakhine Kingdom.

Kaman, one of Rakhine ethnic groups was also supported in New Dannyawadi History by venerable monk U Nyar Na. Moreover, tradition and cultural behavior of Kaman people are the same as Rakhine as mentioned in the book Indigenous people of Rakhine State by journalist turned politician (ex-State Council member) U Hla Tun Pru.

For example, during Thingyan, the water festival and Myanmar New Year eve, there existed old Kaman tradition of shampooing the children, making charitable works by donating lakes for the convenience of water fetching and building rest shelters for travelers were done. Also practicing monogamy and before the marriage, checking the fate of the bride and bridegroom by astronomy and choosing the auspicious day for wedding are the similar tradition of Rakhine custom. Even today Kaman people are not only speaking the Rakhine language but also wearing the Rakhine dress and living peacefully with majority Rakhine people.

It is not true that the word Kaman became in use after the arrival of Indian Royal prince, Shah Shuja and his entourage to Rakhine Kingdom in AD 1234. The Kaman had already been settled down in Rakhine earlier than AD 1234. Kaman archers were serving in the Rakhine Royal army can be found in history of Nga Hnalone Min (1234-1247) Alawma Pyu Min (1250) Narameik Hla (alias) Min Saw Mon (1404-1434), Ba Saw Pru (1459-1482) Min Ba Gyi (alias) Min Bin Gyi (1531-1553)Thadoe Thudama Raza (alias) Min Raza Gyi (1593-1612), Thiri Thudama Raza (alias) Min Khari (1622-1638) -Sandha Thudama Raza (1652-1684), Sandha Wizaya Raza (1710-1731) and many other kings are prior to AD 1234.

Kaman people during Rakhine kings

(1) Nga Hnalone Min (1234-1237 AD)

King Nga Hnalone was the last king in 22nd kings of Datha Raza dynasty whose ancestor king kawlia built the city of Parein. King Nga Hnalone was wise and skilful in administration, therefore when there was a unified Bengal and chakma Kalar and Thet rebellion he sent his reliable Pyisogyi Dhamazeya with an army of 50.000 troops.

The army of King Nga Hnalone was confronted by the Bengal-Chakma troops in Chittagong, but the rebels could not resist and within five days they retreated to Decca where they barricaded. During the fight between the Bengal prince and Rakhine commander in chief Dhama Zeya riding over elephants, the Bengal prince was defeated and

the Bengal army evacuated. Likewise Rakhine army van quashed Delhi troops and also brought Bengal prisoners of war to Rakhine. From the prisoners of war brought from Bengal, altogether (42,700) were assigned to different kinds of duties and (1,000) were transferred for the purpose under Kaman Archer authority, it was described in New Rakhine history (First edition chapter 4) by Taung Kyaung Sayadaw of Ramree. There fore it is true that Kaman Archers had been serving in Rakhine Royal army before the period of Nga Hnalone Min (1234-1237)AD (2) Narameik Hla (alias) Min Saw Mon (1404-1434 AD)

As mentioned in the beginning of this article, the word Kaman was mentioned by researchers as skilled in bow and arrow expertise. British historian Mr G.E.H tarvey also wrote in his prestigious Outline of Burmese History' that the word Kaman was Persian language for (Bow and Arrow).

Rakhine royal army's archers were Rakhine people and they were called in Persian language Kaman was also mentioned in documents collected by C.A Fisher, 'A social Economic and Political Geography of South East Asia. "In that case, between the period of seventh century to fifteenth century, Persian, Arabian and Roman traders sailed through the Arabian sea to the Malay peninsula across Rakhine kingdom. Burma Delta area and Chinese coastal area.

According to British Burma Gazette published in 1897 AD, it was also mentioned that Persian and Arab traders reached the port cities of South East Asian countries including Burma.

Therefore it is undoubtable that trading with foreign countries made the interracial infiltration in language, culture and other sectors. Likewise, the word Kaman of

Persian language became an adopted Rakhine language.

Moreover, from the early period of fifteenth and sixteenth centuries, some Rakhine kings adopted the Islam Titles of Persian style in spite of their Buddhist belief.

References

 

Ethnic groups in Myanmar
Muslim communities in Asia